Giorgi Rekhviashvili (born 1 February 1988) is a Georgian football player who plays for FK Ventspils.

Club career
Rekhviashvili began his career in Olimpi Rustavi. Outside of Georgia, he has played for Turkish club Boluspor as well.

International
He made his debut for the Georgia national football team on 23 January 2017 in a friendly against Uzbekistan.

References

External links
 
 
 
 

1988 births
People from Rustavi
Living people
Footballers from Georgia (country)
Expatriate footballers from Georgia (country)
Georgia (country) international footballers
Association football defenders
FC Metalurgi Rustavi players
FC Dinamo Tbilisi players
FC Chikhura Sachkhere players
Boluspor footballers
FC Saburtalo Tbilisi players
Levadiakos F.C. players
FK Ventspils players
TFF First League players
Erovnuli Liga players
Erovnuli Liga 2 players
Super League Greece players
Latvian Higher League players
Expatriate sportspeople from Georgia (country) in Turkey
Expatriate sportspeople from Georgia (country) in Greece
Expatriate sportspeople from Georgia (country) in Latvia
Expatriate footballers in Turkey
Expatriate footballers in Greece
Expatriate footballers in Latvia